Mauzé is part of the name of 2 communes in the Deux-Sèvres department of France:

 Mauzé-sur-le-Mignon
 Mauzé-Thouarsais